Felice Farina (born 14 August 1954) is an Italian director.

Biography
Felice Farina is a Rome-based artist. He grew through the ferment of Roman avant-garde theatre, both as an actor and backstage, developing – at the same time – a strong interest in animation and special/optical effects for film making. 

Since 1980 he thus experimented filmmaking riding the transition from traditional to digital imaging, producing several works mixing analogical and numerical techniques in film and multivision.
In the same years he started applying elements of technical and industrial design to the field of arts, focusing on the relation between art and science and collaborating on several projects of kinetic and scientific art.

As film director he directed several documentaries and three short movies before making his first feature film Sembra morto ma... è solo svenuto in 1986, written with Gianni Di Gregorio and Sergio Castellitto, who is also the protagonist. He spent many years directing motion pictures, developing a great interest both in film drama research and in the new expressive challenges coming from compositing images and sound in the new multi-layer virtual environments. His film Bidoni (1995) was the first Italian movie edited in Avid environment.

His last work Patria (2014) was inspired by Enrico Deaglio's bestseller Patria 1978–2008 (2009) and was selected in Venice Film Festival Authors Days.

He is known to build most of his own movie equipment. He's also skilled in Arduino programming.

Filmography

Movies
Sembra morto... ma è solo svenuto (1986)
Affetti speciali (anche soggetto e sceneggiatura, 1987)
Sposi (co-regia, 1988)
Affetti speciali (anche sceneggiatura, 1989) 
Condominio (1991)
Ultimo respiro (1992)
Bidoni (anche soggetto e sceneggiatura, 1995)
Senza freni (anche soggetto e sceneggiatura, 2003)
La fisica dell'acqua (anche soggetto e sceneggiatura, 2010)
Patria (anche soggetto, sceneggiatura e produttore, 2014)

Tv 
Stazione di servizio (Rai-1989)
Felipe ha gli occhi azzurri (Rai-1991)
Il caso Bozano (Rai-1996)
Scardabà (Rai-1998)
Nebbia in Val Padana (Rai-2000)

Documentaries
The Trasimeno Lake, TV
 Matera, TV
The tratturo, TV
The Snakes of Cocullo, TV
Santa Gemma, TV
The Vesuvius, TV

Art Works
Respiro (Breath), mechanical sculpture (with Gregorio Botta, 2008) Mart, Rovereto, 2010

Awards
 Annecy Italian Film Festival (1986)
 Menzione Speciale della Giuria per Sembra morto... ma è solo svenuto (1986)
 Annecy Italian Film Festival (1987)
 Menzione Speciale della Giuria per Affetti speciali (1986)
 Annecy Italian Film Festival (1992)
 Gran Prix per Condominio (1991)
 Premio del Pubblico per Condominio (1991)
 Venice Film Festival (1995)
 Ciak d'Oro (special prize) per Bidoni (1995)
 Mostra internazionale del Nuovo Cinema di Pesaro (2009)
 Premio del Pubblico per La fisica dell'acqua (2009)
 Busto Arsizio Film Festival (2010)
 Miglior Regista per La fisica dell'acqua (2010)

External links

1954 births
Living people
Film directors from Rome